South Carolina Highway 322 (SC 322) is a  state highway in the U.S. state of South Carolina. The highway travels through mostly rural areas of York County.

Route description
SC 322 begins at an intersection with SC 49 (Lockhart Road) east-northeast of Pinckneyville, York County. It travels to the northeast and curves to the east-southeast and intersects SC 97. It crosses over Blue Branch and Turkey Creek. It winds its way to the east and enters McConnells. There, it has a very brief concurrency with U.S. Route 321 (US 321; Chester Highway) in town. It travels to the north of Draper Wildlife Management Area. The highway crosses over South Fork Fishing Creek and Stony Fork before intersecting SC 324. There is a crossing of Fishing Creek. It travels to the east-northeast and enters Rock Hill. Then, it crosses Tools Creek. It travels to the east and crosses Wildcat Creek just before an intersection with SC 5/SC 901 (Heckle Boulevard). Then, it curves to the northeast and intersects the southern terminus of SC 5 Conn. (West Main Street). It passes Rock Hill School District Number Three Stadium and Winthrop University. At Oakland Avenue, on the northeastern edge of the university, it intersects the eastern terminus of SC 274. About two blocks later, it passes a U.S. Post Office and Winthrop Park. A few blocks later, it goes by Cherry Park and Sullivan Middle School. A few blocks after passing the Rock Hill Water Filter Plant, it meets its eastern terminus, an intersection with US 21 and SC 121 (Anderson Road/Cherry Road).

Major intersections

See also

References

External links

SC 322 South Carolina Hwy Index

322
Transportation in York County, South Carolina